Logan Trotter (born 27 September 1998) is a Scottish rugby union player. He plays for London Irish in the Gallagher Premiership. Trotter's primary positions are fullback and wing. He previously played for Glasgow Warriors and Stirling Wolves.

Rugby Union career

Amateur career

Trotter moved to Scotland at the age of 5. He played for Stirling County in the Scottish Premiership.

Professional career

He joined the Scottish Rugby Academy in 2018 was assigned to Glasgow Warriors.

Logan played for Stirling Wolves in the Super 6.

He played for Glasgow Warriors against Edinburgh Rugby in the 'best of the Super 6' friendly on 18 June 2022.

He signed for London Irish in 2022.

International career

He was capped by the Scotland U20s in 2017. He played in the u20s World Cup in 2018.

He trained with Scotland 7s in 2021.

References

1998 births
Living people
Glasgow Warriors players
Rugby union wings
London Irish players
Scottish rugby union players
Stirling County RFC players